A polyhydride or superhydride is a compound that contains an abnormally large amount of hydrogen. This can be described as high hydrogen stoichiometry.  Examples include iron pentahydride FeH5, LiH6, and LiH7. By contrast, the more well known lithium hydride only has one hydrogen atom.

Polyhydrides are only known to be stable under high pressure.

Polyhydrides are important because they can form substances with a very high density of hydrogen. They may resemble the elusive metallic hydrogen, but can be made under lower pressures. One possibility is that they could be superconductors.

Structures

The polyhydrides of alkaline earth and alkali metals contain cage structures. Also hydrogen may be clustered into H−, H3−, or H2 units. Polyhydrides of transition metals may have the hydrogen atoms arranged around the metal atom. Computations suggest that increasing hydrogen levels will reduce the dimensionality of the metal arrangement, so that layers form separated by hydrogen sheets. The H3− substructure is linear.

H3+ would form triangular structures in the hypothetical H5Cl.

Compounds
When sodium hydride is compressed with hydrogen, NaH3 and NaH7 form. These are formed at 30 GPa and 2,100 K.

Heating and compressing a metal with ammonia borane avoids using bulky hydrogen, and produces boron nitride as a decomposition product in addition to the polyhydride.

Predicted
Using computational chemistry many other polyhydrides are predicted, including LiH8,
LiH9, LiH10, CsH3, KH5 RbH5, RbH9, NaH9, BaH6, CaH6, MgH4, MgH12, MgH16, SrH4, SrH10, SrH12, ScH4, ScH6, ScH8, YH4 and YH6, YH24, LaH8, LaH10, YH9, LaH11, CeH8, CeH9, CeH10, PrH8, PrH9, ThH6, ThH7 and ThH10, U2H13, UH7, UH8, UH9, AlH5, GaH5, InH5, SnH8, SnH12, SnH14, PbH8, SiH8 (subsequently discovered), GeH8, (although Ge3H11 may be stable instead) AsH8, SbH4, BiH4, BiH5, BiH6, H3Se, H3S, Te2H5, TeH4, PoH4, PoH6, H2F, H3F, H2Cl, H3Cl, H5Cl, H7Cl, H2Br, H3Br, H4Br, H5Br, H5I, XeH2, XeH4,.

Among the transition elements, VH8 in a C2/m structure around 200 GPa is predicted to have a superconducting transition temperature of 71.4 K. VH5 in a P63/mmm space group has a lower transition temperature.

Properties

Superconduction
Under suitably high pressures polyhydrides may become superconducting. Characteristics of substances that are predicted to have high superconducting temperatures are a high phonon frequency, which will happen for light elements, and strong bonds. Hydrogen is the lightest and so will have the highest frequency of vibration. Even changing the isotope to deuterium will lower the frequency and lower the transition temperature. Compounds with more hydrogen will resemble the predicted metallic hydrogen. However, superconductors also tend to be substances with high symmetry and also need the electrons not to be locked into molecular subunits, and require large numbers of electrons in states near the Fermi level. There should also be electron-phonon coupling which happens when the electric properties are tied to the mechanical position of the hydrogen atoms. The highest superconduction critical temperatures are predicted to be in groups 3 and 3 of the periodic table. Late transitions elements, heavy lanthanides or actinides have extra d- or f-electrons that interfere with superconductivity.

For example, lithium hexahydride is predicted to lose all electrical resistance below 38 K at a pressure of 150 GPa. The hypothetical LiH8 has a predicted superconducting transition temperature at 31 K at 200 GPa. MgH6 is predicted to have a Tc of 400 K around 300 GPa. CaH6 could have a Tc of 260 K at 120 GPa. PH3 doped H3S is also predicted to have a transition temperature above the 203 K measured for H3S (contaminated with solid sulfur). Rare earth and actinide polyhydrides may also have highish transition temperatures, for example, ThH10 with Tc = 241 K. UH8, which can be decompressed to room temperature without decomposition, is predicted to have a transition temperature of 193 K. AcH10, if it could be ever made, is predicted to superconduct at temperatures over 204 K, and AcH10 would be similarly conducting under lower pressures (150 GPa).

H3Se actually is a van der Waals solid with formula 2H2Se•H2 with a measured Tc of 105 K under a pressure of 135 GPa.

Ternary superhydrides
Ternary superhydrides open up the possibility of many more formulas. For example, Li2MgH16 may also be superconducting at high temperatures (200 °C). A compound of lanthanum, boron and hydrogen is speculated to be a "hot" superconductor (550K). Elements may substitute for others and so modify the properties eg (La,Y)H6 and (La,Y)H10 can be made to have a slightly higher critical temperature than YH6 or LaH10.

See also
Potassium nonahydridorhenate, stable at ordinary pressures

References

Hydrogen compounds
High-temperature superconductors